Michael Joseph Bost (born December 30, 1960) is an American politician. A member of the Republican Party, he has served as the U.S. representative for Illinois's 12th congressional district since 2015. From 1995 to 2015, Bost was a member of the Illinois House of Representatives, representing the 115th district. Before holding elected office, he was a firefighter.

Early life and career
Bost was raised Baptist and graduated from Murphysboro High School. He attended a firefighter academy program offered by the University of Illinois, later becoming a firefighter. Bost did not complete a college degree. He served in the United States Marine Corps from 1979 to 1982.

Bost ran his family's trucking business for ten years. Since 1989, he and his wife Tracy have owned and operated White House Salon in Murphysboro.

Bost was a member of the Jackson County Board from 1984 to 1988, the treasurer of Murphysboro Township from 1989 to 1992, and trustee of Murphysboro Township from 1993 to 1995, until his election to the Illinois House of Representatives.

Illinois State Legislature
Bost was first elected to the Illinois House of Representatives in November 1994, having lost his first campaign in 1992. In his 1994 campaign against incumbent Gerald Hawkins, he was endorsed by the Chicago Tribune. 

During the 2008 Republican Party presidential primaries, Bost worked on former U.S. Senator Fred Thompson's presidential campaign, serving as a congressional district chair for Illinois's 12th congressional district.

In May 2012, members of the Illinois House were given just 20 minutes to review and vote on a 200-page pension overhaul bill that had been revised at the last minute. Displeased with the situation, Bost exploded on the House floor, saying, "These damn bills that come out of here all the damn time...at the last second and I've got to try figure out how to vote for my people!...Enough! I feel like somebody trying to be released from Egypt! Let my people go!" An opponent ran ads focusing on Bost's anger, but many voters, according to NPR, "see his fury as well-placed." Bost's rant earned him the runner-up spot on CNN's list of "Best Celebrity Flip-Outs of All-Time". He joked about his inclusion on the list, saying "I thought I was going to be No. 1", and later said he had been "angry at how legislators pushed a bill through and how Governor Pat Quinn was running Illinois."

In November 2013, Bost presented fellow U.S. Marine Archibald Mosley with Illinois House Resolution 706 for his lifetime accomplishments, including being among the first African-Americans to serve in the Marines. The presentation was part of a NAACP program.

After the 2014 elections, Bost resigned early from the House to take office in Congress. He was succeeded by Terri Bryant.

Committees
Bost served on the following state legislative committees:
 Appropriations-Higher Education
 Bio-Technology
 Higher Education
 Public Utilities

U.S. House of Representatives

Elections

2014

In 2014 Bost ran for U.S. Congress in Illinois's 12th congressional district. He was unopposed in the Republican primary, and faced the incumbent, William Enyart, in the general election.

Illinois's largely agricultural 12th district was historically Democratic-leaning, but had been trending Republican, with President Obama having carried it by only 2 percentage points in 2012. Enyart was considered vulnerable as a freshman member in a competitive seat. Additionally, Democratic Governor Pat Quinn, who was running for reelection in 2014, was unpopular in the district. The Cook Political Report rated the race a "Toss Up" and the National Journal ranked the district the 21st most likely to flip Republican in 2014.

In a radio interview, Bost said some scientists believe in anthropogenic climate change while other scientists do not.

Bost said he ran because "the federal government has basically blown everything they are doing right now." He said he intended to fight for job growth and immigration reform. Bost challenged Enyart to as many as a dozen debates.

Bost was endorsed by the Illinois Chamber of Commerce.

Bost won the election with 53% of the vote to Enyart's 42%, with Green candidate Paula Bradshaw taking 6%. He won primarily by dominating the areas of the district outside the St. Louis suburbs, taking all but three of the district's 12 counties. He also benefited from the coattails of Bruce Rauner's successful run for governor; Rauner carried every county in the district.

After being elected to the House, Bost said he did not plan to acquire a second residence, but would sleep in his office while in Washington.

2016

Bost ran for reelection in 2016. He was unopposed in the Republican primary, and faced Democrat C.J. Baricevic and Green Party candidate Paula Bradshaw in the general election. Bost won the November 8 general election with 54% of the vote.

Bost was endorsed by the Illinois Education Association, Illinois's largest labor union. In its endorsement, the union cited Bost's "strong record in support of public education in the Metro East and Southern Illinois."

2018

Bost ran for reelection in 2018. In the Republican primary, he defeated challenger Preston Nelson with 83.5% of the vote. In the general election, Bost defeated Democratic nominee Brendan Kelly with 51.8% of the vote to Kelly's 45.2%. Green Party candidate Randy Auxier took 3%.

2020

Bost won the Republican primary unopposed. In the 2020 general election, Bost won with 60.4% of the vote.

Tenure
Bost was sworn into office on January 6, 2015.

In November 2014, Bost described President Obama, his former colleague in the Illinois legislature, as a "fluke" and said that "nobody ever thought he was going to rise." He recalled a time when Obama, speaking to a group of reporters as Bost walked by, had said to them: "There you have it, one of the rich Republicans." Bost purportedly responded, "that just proves you don't know me at all." He said that was his last exchange with Obama.

After James Hodgkinson shot at GOP congressmen who were playing baseball in Virginia on June 14, 2017, injuring Steve Scalise, Bost said that his office has previously received phone calls from the attacker. "He's contacted us just about 10 times, on every issue," Bost said. "[He] was argumentative, but never threatening."

Bost is a member of the Republican Main Street Partnership, which described itself, as of 2015, as "a coalition of over 70 members... who stand for strong, conservative principles in economic and national security policy and believe in governing in a thoughtful and pragmatic manner". and the conservative Republican Study Committee.

At a March 2017 meeting with editors of the Southern Illinoisan, Bost said that he did not do "town halls" because they had become too combative. "You know the cleansing that the Orientals used to do where you'd put one person out in front and 900 people yell at them? That's not what we need. We need to have meetings with people that are productive." His use of the word "Orientals" made national headlines. Bost apologized, saying he had "used a poor choice of words." His spokesman said that Bost had been referring to public humiliation sessions during China's Cultural Revolution.

Farming
In April 2016, a Bost bill to change how the government defines farms and ranches as small businesses passed the House with bipartisan support.

Health care
At a March 2017 "telephone town hall," Bost spoke about health care with several constituents who criticized Obamacare. Bost expressed support for the new American Health Care Act, saying, "doing nothing is not an option." He promised the new bill did not portend a return to pre-Obama health care. "It's not intended to go back to what it was prior to the Affordable Care Act," Bost said. "We have to move forward because the system is collapsing." He also praised "plans to strip money from Planned Parenthood and shift it to local health departments that help with women's needs." On May 4, 2017, Bost voted for the act.

Tax reform
Bost voted for the Tax Cuts and Jobs Act of 2017, saying he believed the bill would enable businesses to compete globally and thereby improve the economy. The individual tax cuts expire in 2022. Bost wants to make them permanent.

In December 2017, Bost signed a letter requesting that two education-related portions of the Internal Revenue code, one providing tuition breaks and the other incentivizing employees "to accept tax-free educational assistance from employers," be left unchanged in the new tax bill. The letter pointed out that seven out of ten college students graduate with student loan debt, which "harms our economy because it prevents many young adults from buying a house, purchasing a car or saving for retirement."

Cannabis

Bost has a "D" rating from marijuana legalization advocacy organization the National Organization for the Reform of Marijuana Laws (NORML) for his voting history regarding cannabis-related causes.

Texas v. Pennsylvania
In December 2020, Bost was one of 126 Republican members of the House of Representatives to sign an amicus brief in support of Texas v. Pennsylvania, a lawsuit filed at the United States Supreme Court contesting the results of the 2020 presidential election, in which Joe Biden defeated incumbent Donald Trump. The Supreme Court declined to hear the case on the basis that Texas lacked standing under Article III of the Constitution to challenge the results of an election held by another state.

LGBT rights
In 2015, Bost condemned the Supreme Court ruling in Obergefell v. Hodges, which held that same-sex marriage bans violated the constitution.

In 2021, Bost was one of 29 Republicans to vote to reauthorize the Violence Against Women Act. This bill expanded legal protections for transgender people, and contained provisions allowing transgender women to use women's shelters and serve time in prisons matching their gender identity.

Committee assignments
Committee on Agriculture
Subcommittee on Biotechnology, Horticulture, and Research
Subcommittee on Commodity Exchanges, Energy, and Credit
Committee on Transportation and Infrastructure
Subcommittee on Water Resources and Environment
Subcommittee on Railroads, Pipelines, and Hazardous Materials
Subcommittee on Highways and Transit
Committee on Veterans' Affairs 
Subcommittee on Disability Assistance and Memorial Affairs (Ranking Member)
Subcommittee on Oversight and Investigations

Caucus memberships 

 Republican Study Committee
 Republican Governance Group
Republican Main Street Partnership
Problem Solvers Caucus (former)

Electoral history

Personal life
Bost and his wife, Tracy, have three children and 11 grandchildren. He has said that his political hero is John Alexander Logan, an Illinois Democrat who had switched parties when the Civil War began. "He was willing to break ranks to do what was right," Bost explained.

Legal trouble
In 1986, his daughter required stitches after being bitten by a beagle after antagonizing and chasing it. Unsatisfied with authorities' lack of an immediate response, Bost drove to the dog's owner's home and shot the dog dead with a handgun while it was in its enclosure. He was arrested and charged with criminal damage to property and reckless misconduct in relation to the incident, but was acquitted at trial. In 2014, Bost joked to a reporter about the killing.

In 2006, authorities confronted Bost after he failed to report that his gun was stolen after it was used to threaten another man's life. He led authorities to his gun safe, which contained a bottle of whiskey and no gun.

References

External links
 Congressman Mike Bost official U.S. House website
 Mike Bost for Congress
 

 

|-

|-

|-

1960 births
20th-century American politicians
21st-century American politicians
American firefighters
Baptists from Illinois
Baptists from the United States
Living people
Republican Party members of the Illinois House of Representatives
Military personnel from Illinois
People from Murphysboro, Illinois
Republican Party members of the United States House of Representatives from Illinois
United States Marines